Archduchess Maria Karoline of Austria (Maria Karoline Luise Christine, Erzherzogin von Österreich; 10 September 1825 – 17 July 1915) was an Archduchess of Austria. She may have been named after her great aunt Maria Carolina.

Life 
Archduchess Maria Karoline was born in Vienna as the second daughter and sixth child of Archduke Charles, Duke of Teschen and Princess Henrietta of Nassau-Weilburg. Her father, the "hero of Aspern", was a son of Leopold II, Holy Roman Emperor and Infanta Maria Luisa of Spain. Her mother was a daughter of Frederick William of Nassau-Weilburg (1768–1816) and his wife Burgravine Louise Isabelle of Kirchberg. Between her siblings there were Maria Theresa, Queen consort of Two Sicilies and Archduke Albrecht, Duke of Teschen.

She was Princess-Abbess of the Theresian Royal and Imperial Ladies Chapter of the Castle of Prague (1844-1852).

On 21 February 1852, Maria Karoline married her cousin Archduke Rainer Ferdinand of Austria, third son of Archduke Rainer of Austria and Princess Elisabeth of Savoy-Carignano. The marriage was a very happy one, and the couple was probably the most popular amongst the Habsburg family. The marriage remained childless.

At the time of her death, she was the last surviving grandchild of Leopold II, Holy Roman Emperor, and the last surviving great-grandchild of Maria Theresa of Austria.

Ancestry

References

External links

1825 births
1915 deaths
Nobility from Vienna
House of Habsburg
Austrian princesses
Austrian Roman Catholics
Burials at the Imperial Crypt